Frank Ernest Halliday (10 February 1903 – 26 March 1982) was an English academic, author and amateur painter. He wrote on a wide range of subjects, though he was best known for his books on William Shakespeare.

F. E. Halliday (he preferred his initials for his books and public life) was born in Bradford, Yorkshire, and educated at King's College, Cambridge, where he earned his M.A. in 1928.

Halliday taught English and history at Cheltenham College, and served as head of the English Department there, from 1929 to 1948. After his retirement from teaching, he and his family moved to St Ives, Cornwall, where Halliday pursued a second career as a professional author. He produced a modern edition of Richard Carew's  The Survey of Cornwall in 1953. He wrote or edited more than 20 books in his lifetime, including a volume of poetry, Meditation at Bolerium (1963). His compendium A Shakespeare Companion was a basic reference work for a generation of readers. First published in 1950, the book went through a major revision and updating for a new edition in 1964, the quatercentenary of Shakespeare's birth.

His 1936 portrait of Cecil Day-Lewis is in the collection of the National Portrait Gallery.

He married Nancibel Beth Gaunt in 1927; they had one child, a son, Michael.

Selected written works by F. E. Halliday
 Shakespeare and His Critics (1949)
 The Enjoyment of Shakespeare (1952)
 Shakespeare in his Age (1956)
 The Cult of Shakespeare (1957)
 A History of Cornwall (1959)
 Indifferent Honest (an autobiography)(1960)
 The Life of Shakespeare (1961)
 Unfamiliar Shakespeare (1962)
 England, a Concise History (1964)
 The Poetry of Shakespeare's Plays (1964)
 An Illustrated Cultural History of England (1967), revised up to 1981
 Chaucer and His World (1968)
 Doctor Johnson and His World (1968)
 Wordsworth and His World (1970)
 Thomas Hardy: His Life and Work (1972)
 The Excellency of the English Tongue (1975)
 Robert Browning: His Life and Work (1975)

References

 Magill, Frank Northen, ed. Cyclopedia of World Authors. Pasadena, CA, Salem, 1974.
 Obituary, The Times, 29 March 1982.

1903 births
1982 deaths
British literary critics
Historians of Cornwall
Shakespearean scholars
Alumni of King's College, Cambridge
Schoolteachers from Gloucestershire
20th-century English historians
20th-century poets